The Roman Catholic Archdiocese of Tulancingo is an archdiocese of the Latin Church of the Roman Catholic Church in Mexico. The Archdiocese comprises the province of Hidalgo, and the archiepiscopal see is located in  the Mexican city of Tulancingo

As  a Metropolitan Archdiocese, it is responsible for the suffragan dioceses of Huejutla and Tula. It was elevated as Archdiocese on November 25, 2005.

The current archbishop is Domingo Díaz Martínez, who was appointed in 2008.

Bishops

Ordinaries
Juan Bautista de Ormeachea y Ernáez (1863–1884) 
Agustín de Jesús Torres y Hernandez, C.M. (1885–1889) 
José María Armas y Rosales (1891–1898) 
Maximiano Reynoso y del Corral (1898–1902) 
José Mora y del Rio (1901–1907) 
José Juan de Jésus Herrera y Piña (1907–1921) 
Vicente Castellanos y Núñez (1921–1932) 
Luis María Altamirano y Bulnes (1933–1937) 
Miguel Darío Miranda y Gómez (1937–1955) 
Adalberto Almeida y Merino (1956–1962) 
José Esaul Robles Jiménez (1962–1974) 
Pedro Aranda-Díaz Muñoz (1975–2008)
Domingo Díaz Martínez (since 2008)

Auxiliary bishop
Luis Benitez y Cabañas, S.J. (1926–1933)

Other priest of this diocese who became bishop
José Fernández Arteaga, appointed Bishop of Apatzingán, Michoacán in 1974

Tulancingo
Hidalgo (state)
Tulancingo, Roman Catholic Archdiocese of
A
Tulancingo
Tulancingo
1863 establishments in Mexico

sv:Tulancingo